Batilly may refer to the following communes in France:

 Batilly, Meurthe-et-Moselle, in the Meurthe-et-Moselle department
 Batilly, Orne, in the Orne department
 Batilly-en-Gâtinais, in the Loiret department
 Batilly-en-Puisaye, in the Loiret department